Ling-Ling (1969–92) and Hsing-Hsing (1970–99) were two giant pandas given to the United States as gifts by the government of China following President Richard Nixon's visit in 1972. As a gift, the U.S. government sent China a pair of musk oxen.

The pandas had been captured in the wild in June and December 1971. When the Nixons had a dinner with Chinese Premier Zhou Enlai at Beijing during the 1972 visit, First Lady Pat Nixon mentioned her fondness for the species, which Zhou replied, "I'll give you some." They arrived at the National Zoo in Washington, D.C., on April 16, 1972, and were formally received several days later, on April 20, at a ceremony attended by Pat Nixon. While at the zoo, they attracted millions of visitors each year.

During their time at the National Zoo, the pair had five cubs between 1983 and 1989, but none of them survived past a few days.

Ling-Ling died suddenly from heart failure on December 30, 1992, at which time she was the longest-lived giant panda in captivity outside China. Hsing-Hsing would go on to pass her record when he was euthanized by zookeepers on November 28, 1999, at the age of 28 due to kidney failure. Following Hsing-Hsing's death, the zoo received thousands of letters and cards from people across the country expressing sympathy.

The Panda House at the National Zoo remained empty for over a year until the arrival of Mei Xiang and Tian Tian from the Wolong Research and Conservation Center for the Giant Panda in December 2000.

See also 
 Panda diplomacy

References

Individual giant pandas
1969 animal births
Hsing-Hsing
1992 animal deaths
Hsing-Hsing
National Zoological Park (United States)
Animals as diplomatic gifts
China–United States relations
Presidency of Richard Nixon